|}

This is a list of electoral region results for the Western Australian Legislative Council in the 2001 Western Australian state election.

Results by Electoral region

Agricultural 

 The Liberal and National parties ran a joint ticket in 1996. The overall swing against the coalition for this region is -19.6.

East Metropolitan

Mining and Pastoral

North Metropolitan

South Metropolitan

South West 

 The Liberal and National parties ran a joint ticket for South West in the 1996 election. The overall swing against the Coalition in the South West region was -10.8.

See also 

 Results of the Western Australian state election, 2001 (Legislative Assembly A-L)
 Results of the Western Australian state election, 2001 (Legislative Assembly M-Z)
 2001 Western Australian state election
 Candidates of the Western Australian state election, 2001
 Members of the Western Australian Legislative Council, 2001–2005

References 

Results of Western Australian elections
2001 elections in Australia